A gravity railroad (American English) or gravity railway (British English) is a railroad on a slope that allows cars carrying minerals or passengers to coast down the slope by the force of gravity alone. The speed of the cars is controlled by a braking mechanism on one or more cars on the train. The cars are then hauled back up the slope using animal power, a locomotive or a stationary engine and a cable, a chain or one or more wide, flat iron bands. A much later example in California used  steam engines to pull gravity cars back to the summit of Mt. Tamalpais. 

The typical amusement park roller coaster is  designed from gravity railroad technology based on the looping track incorporated into the second railroad of the United States, the Mauch Chunk & Summit Hill Railroad, which remained in operation for decades as a tourist ride after it was withdrawn from freight service hauling coal.

Types of gravity railroad
Some gravity railroads were designed to allow the weight of the descending loaded cars to lift the empty cars back up to the top, using a cable looped around a pulley at the top for a portion of the line.  A later revision designed by John B. Jervis, used two separate tracks known as the loaded or heavy track which carried cars loaded with coal to the destination, and the light track, used to return empty cars to the mines. This method allowed cars to travel in a loop, without the need for passing sidings. A stationary steam engine and a looping cable, chain or iron bands were used to raise the empty cars up the lift planes. The cars then coasted down a slight grade to the next lift plane. When cars reversed direction at the ends of the line on a switch or turnout instead of a loop, the railroad was known as a switchback gravity railroad.

Switchback gravity railroad

The term "switchback gravity railroad" is sometimes applied to gravity railroads that used special self-acting (momentum-driven) Y-shaped switches known as switchbacks to automatically reverse a car's direction at certain points as it descends; this essentially folds the incline across the slope in a characteristic "zig-zag" shape. (See diagram: car starts from point A, coasts through switch at B, and comes to a stop at C. Car then rolls through the switch again and proceeds to the switch at D, where the process is repeated.) A separate track was typically used to haul the empty cars back to the top.

The original implementation of this type of system is credited to the Mauch Chunk Switchback Railway, which hauled coal and passengers from 1827 until 1933. This was very popular with tourists, and led to the development of the roller coaster.

Self-acting incline
In the UK and elsewhere, a self-acting incline is one in which the loaded wagons going down pull, via a cable and drum, the empty wagons going up. There might be two separate tracks, or a single track with a passing loop. This system was widely used on slate railways in Wales.

A variation on this system is the cliff railway for passengers, for example the Lynton and Lynmouth Cliff Railway. Both passenger cars are equipped with water tanks and, at the start, both tanks are full. Water is then let out of the tank on the lower car until the difference in weight between the two cars causes them to move.

Examples

United Kingdom
The Ffestiniog Railway in Gwynedd, northwest Wales, was built in 1832 to carry slate from quarries high in the hills to the sea at Porthmadog. The line was laid out for the wagons to descend by gravity, while horses were originally used to haul the empty wagons up the hill. On the downward journey the horses travelled in a Dandy waggon at the rear of the train. Later on, steam haulage was adopted. This narrow gauge railway is still operational but all passenger trains are now locomotive-hauled.

Demonstration gravity trains are still occasionally run using original wagons up to 50 at a time.

United States

In the United States, The Delaware and Hudson Canal Company operated an extensive gravity railroad system from 1828 until 1898. With 22 separate lift planes, the  purchased in 1886 by the recently constructed Shohola Glen Summer Resort (1882) and used until 1907.

Due to the success and advancement of the gravity railroads, a second gravity operation at Hawley and Pittston was created in 1850. This  route from Port Griffith (Pittston) to Paupack Eddy (Hawley) allowed Pennsylvania Coal Company to directly ship anthracite from its Northern Coal Field mines in the Wyoming Valley to Delaware and Hudson Canal and ultimately to the New York markets.

The Ontario and San Antonio Heights Railroad Company was a railway in Ontario, California which operated with a unique Gravity Mule Car. Mules provided the propulsion on the uphill segment, and a pull-out trailer allowed the mules to ride along for the gravity-powered downhill return. Mule cars operated from 1887 to 1895 when the line was electrified.

From 1896 through 1929, steam trains carried passengers up Mount Tamalpais in Marin County, California. In 1902, gravity cars began carrying passengers from the mountain's summit down the  twisting single-track railway to the city of Mill Valley and starting in 1907, the first tourists into Muir Woods. Gravity service supplemented the steam train service. The powerful Shay and Heisler geared steam engines of the Mount Tamalpais & Muir Woods Railway then towed the gravity cars back to the summit for the next scheduled run.

On May 3, 2009, the Gravity Car Barn museum opened at the east peak of Mount Tamalpais to display this novel form of transportation.

Italy
The Modena-Sassuolo railway, activated on 1 April 1883, was also known as the "trenèin dal còcc": in the Modenese dialect the "còcc" was the initial impetus to the train departing from Sassuolo, taking advantage of the mild and regular gradient down to Modena. The train could operate down hill at 20 to 30 km/h under the influence of gravity, and returned to the top with a steam locomotive.

Other inclined railroads
A funicular is not a true gravity railroad, as cars never coast freely and are always connected to a cable. A rack-and-pinion railway or rack railway is also not a true gravity railroad for similar reason.

See also
 Cable railway
 Lynton and Lynmouth Cliff Railway

External links
The Shohola Glen Switchback Gravity Railroad
The Mauch Chunk Switchback Gravity Railroad

References

Bibliography

Railways by type